College of Agriculture, Iguoriakhi is a state owned institution located at Ovia South West 7 years old institution was established by the civilian administration of late Ambrose Ali in 1981, closed by the military governors and reopened by the Lucky Igbinedion administration in 2001.  The school charged with the responsibility of offering Ordinary Diploma and Higher National Diploma in Agricultural Technology, Animal Science, Crop Science, Agricultural Extension and Management temporarily closed on August 2017 by the Godwin Obaseki-led government with a promise to revamping the institution.

References 

Universities and colleges in Nigeria